The IRB International U19 Player of the Year was awarded by the International Rugby Board in the autumn each year from 2002 to 2007. In 2008, it was combined with the IRB International U21 Player of the Year into the IRB Junior Player of the Year award.

List of winners

List of other IRB Awards
 IRB International Player of the Year
 IRB International Team of the Year 
 IRB International Coach of the Year 
 IRB International U21 Player of the Year
 IRB International Sevens Team of the Year
 IRB International Sevens Player of the Year
 Spirit of Rugby Award
 Vernon Pugh Award for Distinguished Service 
 IRB Referee Award for Distinguished Service
 IRB International Women's Personality of the Year
 IRB Development Award 
 IRB Chairman's Award

External links
 Official website

Players